Ove Lars Gösta Malmberg (17 May 1933 – 23 June 2022) was a Swedish ice hockey defenceman and Olympian.

Malmberg played with Team Sweden at the 1956 Winter Olympics held in Cortina d'Ampezzo, Italy. He also played for Djurgårdens IF Hockey and IK Göta in the Swedish Elite League.

References

External links
 
 

1933 births
2022 deaths
Djurgårdens IF Hockey players
Ice hockey players at the 1956 Winter Olympics
IK Göta Ishockey players
Olympic ice hockey players of Sweden
Ice hockey people from Stockholm
Swedish ice hockey defencemen